Wrightsville Historic District is a national historic district located at Wrightsville in York County, Pennsylvania. The district includes 350 contributing buildings and 5 contributing structures in the central business district and surround residential areas of Wrightsville.  A majority of the dwellings are small, frame vernacular workers' houses dated to the 19th century.  More substantial brick and stone dwellings date to as early as he 1790s.  Notable industrial buildings and structures include the Wrightsville Hardware Complex, McConkey Building, Wrightsville silk mill, and lime kilns.

It was listed on the National Register of Historic Places in 1983.

References 

Historic districts on the National Register of Historic Places in Pennsylvania
Federal architecture in Pennsylvania
Historic districts in York County, Pennsylvania
National Register of Historic Places in York County, Pennsylvania
Lime kilns in the United States